The 1960 Dartmouth Indians football team was an American football team that represented Dartmouth College during the 1960 NCAA University Division football season. Dartmouth tied for third in the Ivy League.

In their sixth season under head coach Bob Blackman, the Indians compiled a 5–4 record and outscored opponents 98 to 66. Kenneth DeHaven was the team captain.

The Indians' 4–3 conference record tied for third-best in the Ivy League standings. They outscored Ivy opponents 83 to 51. 

Dartmouth played its home games at Memorial Field on the college campus in Hanover, New Hampshire.

Schedule

References

Dartmouth
Dartmouth Big Green football seasons
Dartmouth Indians football